This page links to the list of mergers and dissolutions of municipalities in Japan for each prefecture.

For a list of dissolved municipalities, see also: Category:Dissolved municipalities of Japan and the sister category Category:Former districts of Japan.

Lists, by prefecture 
Note that most of the prefectural websites linked below are in Japanese.

See also 
 A list of future mergers for every prefecture can be found here .
 A list of former mergers for every prefecture can be found here or here .

Mergers and dissolutions
Mergers and dissolutions of municipalities